The Reunion Tour was a rock concert tour by The Stone Roses. Three homecoming shows in Heaton Park, Manchester and a show in Phoenix Park, Dublin were the first shows to be announced by the band. Fifty shows eventually took place in Europe, Asia, North America and Oceania. The Heaton Park shows currently hold the record for the fastest selling rock gigs in UK history. The Irish Independent described the Dublin leg of the tour as "one of the most anticipated gigs of the year." The Stone Roses also re-entered the music charts on the back of the tour.

History
Reports of a reunion initially surfaced during April 2011, with several media outlets claiming that singer Ian Brown and guitarist John Squire had reconciled for the first time since Squire left the band in 1996. At the time, these were swiftly denied by bassist Mani.

However, on 18 October of the same year, the band called a press conference to confirm their reunion and two homecoming shows at Heaton Park, Manchester on 29 and 30 June 2012. In addition to this, they also stated their intention to complete a reunion world tour and an album of new material.

All 150,000 tickets for the initial two Heaton Park shows sold out in a record 14 minutes. A third show scheduled for 1 July 2012 was promptly put on sale. In total, all 220,000 tickets for the shows sold out in 68 minutes - a record for a UK rock gig. Reviews for the Manchester shows were reported to be "bordering on the ecstatic." However, tragedy struck when a young fan went missing following the Friday show.

Whilst no specific dates were announced, during the reunion press conference Ian Brown stated that the band would visit Ireland, with Ian Brown saying "After Manchester, Ireland is always next on our list". Their Dublin date was announced as being for Phoenix Park on 5 July 2012, on the weekend normally reserved for the Oxegen music festival, which did not take place in 2012.

On 7 November 2011, three further dates were announced for festival headlining slots in Scotland, Spain and Japan.

Schedule
On 15 December 2011, the band announced on their Facebook page, that they would play Germany's Hurricane and Southside Festivals in June, and the Sziget Festival in August 2012.

On 10 October 2012, it was confirmed that the band would tour Australia in 2013, headlining the Future Music Festival along with The Prodigy.

Tour dates

Festivals and other miscellaneous performances

These concerts are a part of the "Future Music Festival"

Cancellations

Box office score data

Setlists

The setlist number below coordinates with the numbers from each show above.

{{hidden
| headercss = background: #ddd; font-size: 100%; width: 100%;
| header = 2
| content =  
"I Wanna Be Adored"
"Sally Cinnamon"
"Mersey Paradise"
"Ten Storey Love Song"
"Where Angels Play"
"Shoot You Down"
"Waterfall"
"Fools Gold"
"Standing Here"
"She Bangs The Drums"
"Made Of Stone"
"This Is The One"
"Love Spreads"

Encore:
"I Am The Resurrection"

}}
{{hidden
| headercss = background: #ddd; font-size: 100%; width: 100%;
| header = 3
| content =  
"I Wanna Be Adored"
"Sally Cinnamon"
"(Song For My) Sugar Spun Sister"
"Where Angels Play"
"Shoot You Down"
"Waterfall"
"Don't Stop"
"Tightrope"
"Fools Gold"
"Something's Burning"
"She Bangs The Drums"
"Made Of Stone"
"Love Spreads"

Encore:
"I Am The Resurrection"

}}

References

The Stone Roses
2012 concert tours
2013 concert tours
Reunion concert tours